Pingasa venusta is a moth of the family Geometridae first described by William Warren in 1894. It is found in the north-eastern Himalayas, Sundaland and on Sulawesi, Seram and on New Guinea. The habitat consists of lowland areas up to 1,930 meters, including disturbed vegetation and secondary forests.

References

Moths described in 1894
Pseudoterpnini